Malenovice is a castle located in the Malenovice part of the city of Zlín in the Czech Republic. It was built in the second half of the 14th century.

External links
 Hrad Malenovice at the  website 
 Hrad Malenovice at hrady.cz 

Castles in the Czech Republic
Castles in the Zlín Region